Alvin W. Thompson (born 1953) is a senior United States district judge of the United States District Court for the District of Connecticut.

Education and career

Born in 1953 in Baltimore, Maryland, Thompson received a Bachelor of Arts from Princeton University in 1975 and a Juris Doctor from Yale Law School in 1978. He was in private practice in Hartford, Connecticut, from 1978 to 1994.

Federal judicial service

Thompson was nominated to the United States District Court for the District of Connecticut by President Bill Clinton on September 14, 1994, to a seat vacated by Ellen Bree Burns. He was confirmed by the United States Senate on October 7, 1994, and received his commission on October 11, 1994. He served as Chief Judge from September 2009 to September 2013. He assumed senior status on August 31, 2018.

See also 
 List of African-American federal judges
 List of African-American jurists

External links

1953 births
Living people
20th-century American judges
20th-century American lawyers
21st-century American judges
African-American judges
African-American lawyers
Judges of the United States District Court for the District of Connecticut
United States district court judges appointed by Bill Clinton
People from Baltimore
Princeton University alumni
Yale Law School alumni